Yam (also Romanized as Yām) is a village in Hesar Rural District, Khabushan District, Faruj County, North Khorasan Province, Iran. At the 2006 census, its population was 1,428, in 400 families.

References 

Populated places in Faruj County